Raimo Saviomaa (born 15 April 1946) is a Finnish footballer. He played in 26 matches for the Finland national football team from 1968 to 1974.

References

External links
 

1946 births
Living people
Finnish footballers
Finland international footballers
Place of birth missing (living people)
Association footballers not categorized by position